Jazzland Recordings is a Norwegian jazz and improvised music label based in Oslo, Norway, often associated with nu jazz.

It was founded in 1996 by pianist Bugge Wesseltoft to release his "New Conception of Jazz" and operate as a standalone label. There were three divisions of the Jazzland: "Jazzland", "Grüner", and "Acoustic", but these were dropped.

Roster

 Greta Aagre and Erik Honoré
 Eivind Aarset
 Atomic
 Jon Balke
 Jan Bang
 Beady Belle
 Mari Kvien Brunvoll
 Come Shine
 The Core
 Jon Eberson
 Sidsel Endresen
 Endresen/Wesseltoft Duo
 Torun Eriksen
 Ingebrigt Håker Flaten
 Frøydis Grorud
 Humvee
 Patrick Shaw Iversen & Raymond Pellicer
 Maria Kannegaard
 Audun Kleive
 Håkon Kornstad
 Ola Kvernberg
 Lord Kelvin
 Merriwinkle
 Mopti
 Motif
 Mungolian Jet Set
 Punkt
 Javid Afsari Rad
 Live Maria Roggen
 Samsa'Ra
 Shining
 Stein Urheim and Mari Kvien Brunvoll
 Rob Van De Wouw
 Paolo Vinaccia
 Bugge Wesseltoft
 Bugge Wesseltoft and Henrik Schwarz 
 Wibutee
 Håvard Wiik
 Dhafer Youssef

References

External links
Official website

Jazz record labels
Norwegian record labels
Record labels established in 1997